Ted Clamp (1924–1990) was an English footballer who played as a goalkeeper for various teams during the 1940s, 50s and early 60s.

English footballers
Derby County F.C. players
Bolton Wanderers F.C. wartime guest players
Association football goalkeepers
People from Swadlincote
Footballers from Derbyshire
1924 births
1990 deaths
Place of death missing